Suhler is a surname. Notable people with the surname include:

Jim Suhler (born 1960), American Texas Blues guitarist
Simon Suhler (1844–1895), private in the United States Army